Ricardo Antonio Morales Gonzalez (born September 30, 1973 in Mexico City, Mexico), better known under the ring name Cerebro Negro ("Black Brain"), is a Mexican luchador, or masked professional wrestler currently working for the Mexican professional wrestling promotion International Wrestling Revolution Group (IWRG) portraying a rudo ("Bad guy") wrestling character as well as a number of independent promotions.

Professional wrestling career
Ricardo Antonio Morales Gonzalez made his professional wrestling debut in 1991, but never revealed what ring name he used between 1991 and 1998. In Lucha libre the real life identities of masked wrestlers are generally kept private including not revealing their real names. previous identities are at times not revealed, which is the case with Ricardo Morales. He has stated that he started wrestling in 1991 but never revealed what ring name he used.

Guerra C-3 (1998–2002)
Morales adopted the enmascarado (masked) character Guerra C-3 ("War C-3") in early 1998 while working for Promo Azteca. The character was a "wrestling version" of the android C-3PO from the Star Wars movies, who teamed up with "Galaxia R2" ("Galaxy R2"), inspired by R2-D2. In 1999 the tag team began working regularly for International Wrestling Revolution Group (IWRG) based in Naucalpan, Mexico State. The team generally wrestled on the lower half of the show, facing such teams as Los Hijos del Espanto (I and II), Los Megas (Mega and Super Mega) and Los Avismans (I and II), taking the masks of the latter tag team in the fall of 2002. Guerra C3 and Galaxia R2 turned heel but they did not achieve any success and in 2003 Galaxia R2 left IWRG or took another gimmick.

Cerebro Negro (2002–present)
In late 2002 Morales abandoned the Guerra C-3 character and instead began working as Cerebro Negro ("Black Brain"), a rudo character (a wrestler who portrays the "bad guy", also called a "heel"). Morales was actually not the first person to work as Cerebro Negro, but the first wrestler to use the name only did so for a short period of time and IWRG decided to pass the character on to Morales. The original Cerebro Negro only worked under that name for such a brief period of time that it was not obvious that the man beneath the mask had changed. In one of his early matches he defeated Dr. Cerebro, a wrestler with a similar character who would later become both a tag team partner and a rival. On October 10, 2002 Cerebro Negro defeated Dr. cerebro to win his first of an eventual five IWRG Intercontinental Welterweight Championships, a title he would only hold for 17 days before losing it to Fantasy. He regained the title from Fantasy on August 24, 2008 and would go on to hold it for 105 days before losing it to Avisman. He would later regain the title from Avisman. In 2004 Cerebro Negro began teaming with Dr. Cerebro Negro on a regular basis,to form Los Terrible Cerebros, who would win the IWRG Intercontinental Tag Team Championship on two separate occasions. In 2005 Los Terrible Cerebros would team up with Veneno to win the Distrito Federal Trios Championship and in 2007 the two, along with Mike Segura would win the IWRG Intercontinental Trios Championship. On the Mexican Independent Circuit Cerebro Negra formed La Secta Nega ("The Black Sect") teaming up with Carta Brava Jr. and Fantasma de la Opera. On November 3, 2005 Cerebro Negro competed in the 2005 El Castillo del Terror show's main event, a steel cage match where the last man in the ring would be forced to unmask . Cerebro Negro was forced to remove his mask when Masada was the last man to climb out of the ring. Following the loss he had to show his face, announced his real name, age and in-ring experience as dictated by the Lucha libre traditions. Two weeks after his mask loss Cerebro Negro outlasted 29 other competitors to win the IWRG Rey del Ring tournament. A year later he would repeat the feat and become the only person so far to win 2 Rey del Ring tournaments. Los Terrible Cerebros would also win the hair of Los Gemelo Fantastico ("The Fantastic Twins") in a tag team Lucha de Apuesta match that took place on October 31, 2008. Later on Los Terrible Cerebros would be expanded with longtime wrestler Black Terry, a trio that would hold the Distrito Federal Trios Championship for 488 days straight, defending the championship on multiple occasions. During their run as the trios champions Dr. Cerebro and Cerebro Negro were forced to face off against each other in aLucha de Apuesta after both competitors lost a Steel Cage match, the match saw Dr. Cerebro defeat his partner, leaving Cerebro Negro bald. In April, 2010 the Mexico City wrestling Commission stripped Los Terrible Cerebros of the championship when Cerebro Negro temporarily stopped working for IWRG. They held a tournament to crown new champions which included the team of Cerebro Negro, Kaos and Veneno which was eliminated in the first round by  Los Gringos VIP (Avisman, El Hijo del Diablo and Gringo Loco).

In late 2010 Cerebro Negro worked on a show for AAA, one of Mexico's two major wrestling promotions, through AAA's working relationship with IWRG. He, Dr. Cerebro and Chico Che lost to the team of Areo Star, Gato Eveready and Relámpago. Later on he, Dr. Cerebro and Eterno would compete in a tournament for the newly created AAA World Trios Championship, but lost in the first round to Los Bizarros (Charly Manson, Cibernético and Billy el Malo). On June 30, 2012 Cerebro Negro won the International Wrestling League's IWL International Junior Heavyweight Championship as he defeated Mike Segura and Aeroboy on IWL's "Armageddon" show in Tlalnepantla de Baz, State of Mexico. On August 17, 2012 he competed in Desastre Total Ultraviolento's (DTU) first ever Rey del Raquetazo (King of the Chop") tournament. Instead of a wrestling tournament the Rey del Raquetazo saw two competitors take turns Chopping each other in the chest, gaging the fans reaction to the impact. In the first round Cerebro Negro defeated Principe Halcon, in the second he defeated team mate Fantasma de la Opera and in the finals he overcame Comando Negro to become El Rey de Raquetazo In late 2012 Cerebro Negro was one of eight competitors wrestling for the vacant WWS World Welterweight Championship promoted by IWRG. In the first round he defeated Dinamic Black, in the second he defeated Eita and in the finals he defeated former partner, turned rival Dr. Cerebro to win the vacant championship. The rivalry between the two Cerebros led to a Lucha de Apuesta ("Bet match") between the two that ended with Dr. Cerebro pinning Cerebro Negro and thus Negro had all his hair shaved off as per the Apuesta stipulation. On February 14, 2013 Carta Brava, Jr. won the WWS World Welterweight Championship from Cerebro Negro. On April 20, 2016 Cerebro Negro defeated Mike Segura to win the vacant IWRG Intercontinental Welterweight Championship for the sixth time.

Championships and accomplishments
Alianza Universal De Lucha Libre
AULL Trios Championship (1 time, current) - with Carta Brava, Jr. and Fantasma de la Opera
Desastre Total Ultraviolento
Rey del Raquetazo tournament (2012)
International Wrestling Revolution Group
IWRG Intercontinental Middleweight Championship (3 times)
IWRG Intercontinental Tag Team Championship (2 time) – with Dr. Cerebro
IWRG Intercontinental Trios Championship (2 times) – with Veneno and Scorpio Jr., Dr. Cerebro and Mike Segura
IWRG Intercontinental Welterweight Championship (6 times)
Distrito Federal Trios Championship (3 times) – with Dr. Cerebro and Veneno (1), Dr. Cerebro and Black Terry (2)
WWS World Welterweight Championship (1 time)
IWRG Rey del Ring (2005, 2006)
International Wrestling League
IWL International Junior Heavyweight Championship (1 time)
WWA Trios Championship (1 time, current) - with Carta Brava, Jr. and Fantasma de la Ópera

Luchas de Apuestas record

Footnotes

References

1973 births
Living people
Masked wrestlers
Mexican male professional wrestlers
Professional wrestlers from Mexico City